Tornatellides is a genus of minute, air-breathing land snails, terrestrial gastropod mollusks, or micromolluscs in the family Achatinellidae.

Distribution
This genus is endemic to the islands of the South Pacific.

Predators
Individuals of the Hawaiian species are preyed upon by caterpillars of the moth Hyposmocoma molluscivora.

Species
Species within the genus Tornatellides include:
 Tornatellides attenuatus  
 Tornatellides bellus  
 Tornatellides boeningi (Schmacker and Boettger, 1891)
 Tornatellides brunneus  
 Tornatellides bryani  
 Tornatellides comes  
 Tornatellides compactus  
 Tornatellides confusus  
 Tornatellides cyphostyla  
 Tornatellides diptyx  
 Tornatellides drepanophorus  
 Tornatellides euryomphala  
 Tornatellides forbesi  
 Tornatellides frit  
 Tornatellides idae  
 Tornatellides inornatus  
 Tornatellides insignis  
 Tornatellides irregularis  
 Tornatellides kahoolavensis  
 Tornatellides kahukuensis  
 Tornatellides kamaloensis  
 Tornatellides kilauea  
 Tornatellides konaensis  
 Tornatellides leptospira  
 Tornatellides lordhowensis  
 Tornatellides macromphala 
 Tornatellides macroptychia  
 Tornatellides moomomiensis  
 Tornatellides neckeri  
 Tornatellides oahuensis  
 Tornatellides oncospira  
 Tornatellides oswaldi  
 Tornatellides perkinsi  
 Tornatellides pilsbryi  
 Tornatellides plagioptyx  
 Tornatellides popouelensis  
 Tornatellides prionoptychia  
 Tornatellides procerulus  
 Tornatellides productus  
 Tornatellides pyramidatus  
 Tornatellides ronaldi  
 Tornatellides rudicostatus  
 Tornatellides serrarius  
 Tornatellides spaldingi  
 Tornatellides stokesi  
 Tornatellides subangulatus
 Tornatellides subperforata  
 Tornatellides terebra  
 Tornatellides tryoni
 Tornatellides virgula  
 Tornatellides vitreus  
 Tornatellides waianaensis

References

 Powell A W B, New Zealand Mollusca, William Collins Publishers Ltd, Auckland, New Zealand 1979